The Aniliidae are a monotypic family created for the monotypic genus Anilius that contains the single species Anilius scytale. Common names include the American pipe snake and false coral snake. It is found in South America. This snake possesses a vestigial pelvic girdle that is visible as a pair of cloacal spurs. It is ovoviviparous. It is non-venomous, and its diet consists mainly of amphibians and other reptiles. Two subspecies are recognized, including the nominate subspecies described here.

Description

This species is found in the Amazon rainforest of South America, the Guianas, and Trinidad and Tobago. It is reported to be ovoviviparous and feeds on beetles, caecilians (burrowing legless amphibians), amphisbaenids or worm lizards (legless lizards), small fossorial snakes, fish, and frogs. It has a cylindrical body of uniform diameter and a very short tail; it is brightly banded in red and black and its reduced eyes lie beneath large head scales. It is considered to be the snake that most resembles the original and ancestral snake condition, such as a lizard-like skull.

Geographic range
It is found in the tropics of northern South America from southern and eastern Venezuela, Guyana, Suriname and French Guiana south through the Amazon Basin of Colombia, Ecuador, Peru, and Brazil. The type locality given is "Indiis".

Subspecies

Taxonomy
Modern classifications restrict the family to the South American pipe snake or false coral snake (Anilius scytale), with the previously included Asian genus Cylindrophis raised to a separate family, Cylindrophiidae. Anilius is not closely related to Asian pipesnakes. Instead, its closest relatives appear to be the neotropical Tropidophiidae.

References

Further reading

 Boos HEA. 2001. The Snakes of Trinidad and Tobago. College Station, Texas: Texas A&M University Press. .
 Martins M, Oliveira ME. 1999. Natural history of snakes in forests of the Manaus region, Central Amazonia, Brazil. Herpetological Natural History 6: 78-150. PDF.

External links

 

 
Reptiles of Guyana
Reptiles of Trinidad and Tobago
Monotypic snake genera
Taxa named by Leonhard Stejneger
Reptiles described in 1758
Taxa named by Carl Linnaeus